Marisa dos Reis Nunes ComIH (born 16 December 1973), known professionally as Mariza, is a Portuguese fado singer.

Mariza was born in Lourenço Marques, Portuguese Mozambique, to a Portuguese father, José Brandão Nunes, and a Mozambican mother, Isabel Nunes.  When she was three years old, her family moved to Metropolitan Portugal, and she was raised in Lisbon's historic quarters of Mouraria and Alfama. While very young she began singing in a wide variety of musical styles, including gospel, soul and jazz.  Her father strongly encouraged her to adopt fado; he felt that participating in the traditional music would grant her greater acceptance in the Portuguese community. Mariza has sold over 1 million records worldwide.

Music career
In 1999, fado's most famous and beloved interpreter, Amália Rodrigues died.  In the public remembrance and mourning that followed, fado regained much of its previous popularity, and Mariza was asked to perform a broadcast tribute to Rodrigues' memory, which caused her friends to begin urging her to record an album of fado music.  She did so, and in 2001 Fado em Mim was released.  It sold an astounding 100,000 copies (4,000 copies of a fado disc would have been considered successful).  After this the record company made the disc available worldwide, and sales eventually topped 140,000 copies.

One of Mariza's hit songs, Transparente is a tribute to her African grandmother.

Mariza sang the Portuguese national anthem at the 2002 FIFA World Cup of football, at the game which pitted the home team (South Korea) against Portugal.

By the time Mariza's second album, Fado Curvo, was released in 2003, she was considered a member of the New Fado movement, with a voice reminiscent of traditional divas of the musical form such as Rodrigues. Her interpretations of fado standards brought her rapid international recognition, leading to her being the recipient, in March 2003, of BBC Radio 3's award for Best European Artist in World Music. Her British television debut was on Later with Jools Holland. For the Olympic Games of Athens 2004 she sang "A Thousand Years," as a duet with Sting. It was released on the official pop album of the Athens Olympics, Unity, on which fado is sung in English and Portuguese.

In 2004 Mariza won an EBBA Award. Every year the European Border Breakers Awards (EBBA) recognize the success of ten emerging artists or groups who reached audiences outside their own countries with their first internationally released album in the past year.

Mariza's third album, Transparente, was recorded in Brazil and released in 2005. She performed at Live 8; she sang at the Eden Project in Cornwall, after which she has been invited to concerts and events worldwide to promote Portuguese culture, from Australia to Finland, the United States and Argentina. That album eventually reached Top Ten in countries which include The Netherlands, Spain and Finland. Mariza, who lives in the upmarket Alcântara dockside area of Lisbon, has received many awards from countries such as Denmark, Australia, Canada, Germany, UK, Guinea-Bissau and Equatorial Guinea.

She has performed in venues such as New York's Carnegie Hall and Central Park, Walt Disney Concert Hall, Barbican, Hollywood Bowl, London's Royal Albert Hall, Union Chapel, Royal Festival Hall, Lisbon's Centro Cultural de Belém, Frankfurt's Alte Oper, Paris' Théâtre de la Ville, Madrid's Teatro Albéniz, Barcelona's Teatro Grec, X Cairo International Song Festival 2004, Centro Cultural de Macau, Moscow International House of Music, Toronto's Massey Hall, Sydney Opera House and the National Concert Hall in Dublin in February 2010.

Her album released in 2007 Concerto em Lisboa received a Latin Grammy nomination for Best Folk Album. The following year, she again released an album, Terra which also was nominated for Best Folk Album at the Latin Grammy Awards. This album continued to mix a variety of genres, containing basic fado influenced by jazz, flamenco, Latin and African sounds.

In 2010, Mariza was featured in the pilot episode of the PBS music series, Sound Tracks: Music Without Borders, singing the "global hit" -- "Minh' Alma." In 2010, Mariza released the album Fado Tradicional, returning to the roots of Fado, but also interpreting the music in Mariza's unique style.

Beginning on 28 February 2011 the airline TAP Portugal began airing its "TAP With Arms Wide Open" (TAP de Braços Abertos) campaign, featuring its new slogan. Three singers, Mariza, the Brazilian singer Roberta de Sá, and the Angolan singer Paulo Flores starred in a music video with the song "Arms Wide Open."

Mariza performed alongside Ana Moura as the opening act of the Grand Final of the Eurovision Song Contest 2018 held in Lisbon, Portugal, singing Barco Negro.

Personal life
Mariza was married to António Ferreira, father of the singer's first and only child, Martim, born on 6 July 2011 two months ahead of schedule, and later diagnosed with attention deficit hyperactivity disorder. Mariza said that her Catholic faith strengthened as a result of a promise that she made to Our Lady of Fátima, after the birth of her son.

Discography

Studio albums

Live albums

Singles

Featured songs

Year-end chart

Video albums

References

External links

"Q & A: Mariza." CNN. 4 October 2006. interview with Mariza

Mariza sings on PBS

1973 births
Living people
People from Maputo
21st-century Portuguese women singers
Portuguese fado singers
Portuguese Roman Catholics
Mozambican emigrants to Portugal
Singers from Lisbon
Golden Globes (Portugal) winners
Women in Latin music